Berkeley Vale may refer to:

Berkeley Vale, New South Wales - A suburb on the Central Coast of New South Wales, Australia
Berkeley Vale, Gloucestershire - An area in Gloucestershire, England